Sustut Peak, prominence: , is the highest summit in the drainage of the Sustut River in British Columbia, Canada.

See also
Sustut Park and Protected Area

References

Two-thousanders of British Columbia
Omineca Mountains
Omineca Country
Skeena Country
Cassiar Land District